African Indonesians are an ethnic group of Indonesians with total or partial ancestry from any of the black racial groups of Africa who were born in or immigrated to Indonesia. The first wave of immigration was in the 19th century, between 1830 and 1872.

References

Ethnic groups in Indonesia
African diaspora in Indonesia
Immigration to Indonesia
Indonesian people of African descent